John Petersen may refer to:

John Petersen (footballer) (born 1972), Faroese footballer
John Petersen (politician) (1948-2018), Faroese politician in Cabinet of Anfinn Kallsberg I
John Petersen (musician) (1942–2007), American drummer
John C. Petersen (1842–1887), Wisconsin legislator
John D. Petersen (born 1947), former president of the University of Tennessee system
Johnny Petersen (born 1947), Danish football manager
John "Chap" Petersen (born 1968), Virginia politician

See also
Jack Petersen (1911–1990), Welsh boxer and two-time British heavyweight boxing champion
Jack Petersen (guitarist) (born 1933), American jazz guitarist and jazz studies pioneer
Jann Ingi Petersen (born 1984), Faroese footballer
John Peterson (disambiguation)